These hits topped the Dutch Top 40 in 2005 (see 2005 in music).

Number-one artists

See also
2005 in music

2005 in the Netherlands
Netherlands
2005